Irvin Michael Stein (May 21, 1911 – January 7, 1981) was a Major League Baseball pitcher who played in  with the Philadelphia Athletics. He batted and threw right-handed.

External links

1911 births
1981 deaths
Major League Baseball pitchers
Baseball players from Louisiana
Philadelphia Athletics players
Nashville Vols players
Hammond Berries players